Bina Avrile Guiducci is a retired Italian shotgun shooter who won three world titles in 1969–1979. She was the first Italian woman to win a world title in shooting. She retired around 1992.

Avrile took up shotgun shooting as therapy to recover from an illness, which left her bed-ridden. She used a Perazzi shotgun.

References

Living people
Italian female sport shooters
Year of birth missing (living people)